Howard Reig (May 31, 1921 – November 10, 2008) was an American radio and television announcer. His last name was pronounced "reeg."

Personal life
Reig was born on May 31, 1921 in New York City. He was a staff announcer for General Electric's Schenectady, New York stations WGY (AM), WGFM (now WRVE) and WRGB starting in 1943, and the National Broadcasting Company (NBC) from 1952 to 2005. He is most well known for being the voice of NBC Nightly News. Until the late 1970s, he also handled announcing duties for the local newscasts of the network's New York City flagship station, WNBC-TV.

Although he retired from NBC on March 25, 2005, he was still heard on Nightly News until December 14, 2007 when anchor Brian Williams announced a new voice "that you all know" will debut as the new announcer beginning December 17, 2007. The new voice is that of actor Michael Douglas.

He earned a B.A. and M.F.A. from SUNY Albany.

Death
Howard Reig died on November 10, 2008, aged 87, in Venice, Florida.

References

External links
 Official website
 
  Howard Reig radio credits 
 

1921 births
2008 deaths
Television personalities from New York City
American male voice actors
NBCUniversal people
NBC News people
NBC network announcers
People from Venice, Florida
Radio personalities from New York City
Radio and television announcers
University at Albany, SUNY alumni